is a Japanese mystery writer. Born in Fukuyama City, Hiroshima Prefecture, Japan.

Biography 

Soji Shimada graduated from Seishikan High School in Fukuyama City, Hiroshima Prefecture, and later Musashino Art University as a Commercial arts design major.

After spending years as a dump truck driver, free writer, and musician, he made his debut as a mystery writer in 1981 when The Tokyo Zodiac Murders was shortlisted for the Edogawa Rampo Prize.
His most well-known works in Japan include the Detective Mitarai Series and the Detective Yoshiki Series. His works often involve themes such as the death penalty, Nihonjinron (his theory on the Japanese people), and Japanese and international culture. He is a strong supporter of amateur Honkaku (i.e. authentic, orthodox) mystery writers. Following the trend of Social School of crime fiction led by Seicho Matsumoto, he was the pioneer of "Shin-Honkaku" (New Orthodox) logic mystery genre. He bred authors such as Yukito Ayatsuji, Rintaro Norizuki and Shogo Utano, and he led the mystery boom from the late 1980s to present day. As the father of "Shin-Honkaku," Shimada is sometimes referred to as "The Godfather of Shin-Honkaku" or "God of Mystery.”

His humor mysteries such as Soseki and the London Mummy Murders and Let There Be Murder, Any Kind of Murder involve an extravagant mystery trick as well as elements of satire, confusion, youth, and survival.

In recent years, he has begun a new challenge—an animated series called the "Taiga Novels," collaborated with the renowned illustrator Masamune Shirow. Upon its kick-off in January 2008, he and Shirow plan to create a twelve-book series through the Kodansha BOX publishers. On top of the BOX, Shimada holds a column in the celebrated magazine, the Weekly Shincho. He is also heading two newly founded Amateur Mystery Novel contests—first, "The City of Roses Fukuyama Mystery Award" for amateur writers in Japan, and the "Soji Shimada Mystery Award" in Taiwan, sponsored by Crown Publishing company. In 2019 he joined the curated group of award-winning Japanese authors Red Circle Authors.

Uncrowned King 
 The two books,Murder in the Crooked Mansion and Water that the Dead Drink, published after "The Tokyo Zodiac Murders" were also submitted for the Edogawa Rampo Prize. However, both of them failed to make it to the finalist list, only passing the preliminary round.
 In 1984, Soji Shimada was nominated for the Naoki Prize by "Soseki and the London Mummy Murders". In 1985, he was nominated for Naoki Prize by"Summer, 19-year-old portrait". However, he didn't win the prize in the end. After that, he has not been nominated for the Naoki Prize for any of his subsequent works. 
 In 1985, Soji Shimada was nominated for the Yoshikawa Literature Newcomer Award by "Soseki and the London Mummy Murders", but was not won.
 Soji Shimada was nominated for the Mystery Writers of Japan Awardas a candidate eight times in eight consecutive years, but this was declined by himself before the selection process. 
 Although Soji Shimada seemed reluctant to enter the awards race due to the above-mentioned rejection of his nomination for the Mystery Writers of Japan Award, he accepted the nomination without rejection when his 2005 novel "The Phantom of the Skyscraper" was nominated for the Honkaku Mystery Award. The result, however, was that Keigo Higashino's "The Devotion of Suspect X" won the award, while "The Phantom of the Skyscraper" had to settle for runner-up by two votes.
 As described above, although Soji Shimada had been a leader in the field of Honkaku mystery in Japan since his debut, he had never won any awards, and was sometimes referred to as the "uncrowned king". However, on October 22, 2008, he won the 12th Japan Mystery Literature Grand Prize. He was finally getting the credit he deserves.
 Later in 2010, he was nominated for the 11th Honkaku Mystery Award for his work "Sharaku: Tojita Kuni no Maboroshi" but did not win (the Prize went to "one-eyed girl" by Yutaka Maya).

Works in English translation 
Novel
 The Tokyo Zodiac Murders (original title: Senseijutsu Satsujin Jiken), trans. Ross and Shika Mackenzie, IBC Publishing, 2004  and, Pushkin Vertigo, 2015 
Murder in the Crooked House (original title: Naname Yashiki no Hanzai), trans. Louise Heal Kawai, Pushkin Vertigo, 2019 
 One Love Chigusa，trans. David Warren, Red Circle Authors, 2020 

Short stories
 "The Locked House of Pythagoras" (original title: P no Misshitsu) (Ellery Queen's Mystery Magazine, August 2013)
 "The Executive Who Lost His Mind" (original title: Hakkyō-suru Jūyaku) (Ellery Queen's Mystery Magazine, August 2015)
 "The Running Dead" (Ellery Queen's Mystery Magazine, November–December 2017)

Bibliography

Detective Kiyoshi Mitarai Series
Novels

Novella collections

Short story collections

Detective Takeshi Yoshiki Series
All works, with the exception of The Fading "Crystal Express," have been published by Kobunsha Press. A portion of the works have been
adapted into a TV series by TBS: Takeshi Yoshiki Series.
Novels
 – Dramatized into TV episode 1

 – Dramatized into TV episode 3

 – Dramatized into TV Episode 2

 – Dramatized into TV Episode 4

Short story collection

Standalone novels

Summer, 19-year-old portrait  ( 夏、19歳の肖像, Natsu, jukyusai no shozo  (Bungei October 1985)

Notes and references

External links 
 Global Mystery Fusion Watch – Soji Shimada Official site 
 Soji Shimada Mystery Award 
 J'Lit | Authors : Soji Shimada | Books from Japan
Profile and Interview: Soji Shimada - Red Circle Authors

1948 births
Living people
Japanese writers
Japanese mystery writers
People from Fukuyama, Hiroshima
Writers from Hiroshima Prefecture